Katherine Roberts Maher (born April 18, 1983) is a former chief executive officer and executive director of the Wikimedia Foundation. 

A member of the Council on Foreign Relations, Maher worked for UNICEF, the National Democratic Institute, the World Bank and Access Now before joining the Wikimedia Foundation. She subsequently joined the Atlantic Council and currently serves on the US Department of State’s Foreign Affairs Policy Board.

Early life and education 

Maher grew up in Wilton, Connecticut and attended Wilton High School. After high school, Maher graduated from the Arabic Language Institute's Arabic Language Intensive Program of The American University in Cairo in 2003, which she recalled as a formative experience that instilled a deep love of the Middle East. Maher subsequently studied at the Institut français d’études arabes de Damas  in Syria and spent time in Lebanon and Tunisia.

In 2005, Maher received a bachelor's degree from New York University in Middle Eastern and Islamic Studies.

Maher originally intended to be an academic and work for human rights and international development organizations.

Career 

After internships at the Council on Foreign Relations and Eurasia Group, in 2005, Maher began working at HSBC in London, Germany, and Canada as part of their international manager development program.

In 2007, Maher returned to New York City where from 2007 to 2010 she worked at UNICEF as an innovation and communication officer. She worked to promote the use of technology to improve people's lives and traveled extensively to work on issues related to maternal health, HIV/AIDS prevention, and youth participation in technology. One of her first projects at UNICEF involved testing MediaWiki extensions related to accessibility in Ethiopia. Another project received USAid Development 2.0 Challenge grant funding to work on the use of mobile phones to monitor nutrition in children in Malawi.

From 2010 to 2011, Maher worked at the National Democratic Institute as an ICT Program Officer. From 2011 to 2013, Maher worked at the World Bank as an ICT innovation specialist and consulted on technology for international development and democratization, working on ICT for accountability and governance with a focus on the role of mobile phones and other technologies in facilitating civil society and institutional reform, particularly in the Middle East and Africa. She co-authored a chapter on "Making Government Mobile" of a World Bank publication titled Information and Communications for Development 2012: Maximizing Mobile. In 2012, Maher's Twitter feed on issues related to the Middle East was noted for its coverage of the Arab Spring.

From 2013 to 2014, Maher was advocacy director at the Washington, D.C.-based Access Now. As part of this work, she focused on the impact on people of laws about cyber security, morality, and defamation of the state that increase state censorship and reduce dissent. Access was a signatory of the Declaration of Internet Freedom.

Maher was chief communications officer of the Wikimedia Foundation from April 2014 to March 2016. She was interviewed by The Washington Post on United States copyright law.

Maher became interim executive director of the Wikimedia Foundation in March 2016 following the resignation of executive director Lila Tretikov and was appointed executive director on June 23, 2016.

In 2019, Maher became CEO of Wikimedia. She stepped down from her positions as CEO and executive director of the Wikimedia Foundation on April 15, 2021. Maryana Iskander was appointed as her successor.

Maher states that she focuses on global digital inclusion as a way to improve and protect the rights of people to information through technology. 

In 2022, Maher joined the US State Department's Foreign Affairs Policy Board, an expert panel established in 2011 by then-Secretary of State Hillary Clinton to advise US officials.

Honors 

 In 2013, The Diplomatic Courier named her as one of 99 leading foreign policy professionals under age 33.

Affiliations 
 American University of Beirut, Member of the Board
 Council on Foreign Relations, Member
 Sunlight Foundation, Member of the Board
 2011: Youth for Technology Foundation, Member of the Board
 2013: Truman National Security Project, Policy Fellow, National Security Fellow, and Research Fellow, Democracy & Human Rights Initiative
 2013: Open Technology Fund, Advisory Committee Member
 2016: World Economic Forum, Member, Global Network Council on the Future of Human Rights
 2018: Oxford Union, on Technology and Empire
 2019: World Economic Forum Young Global Leader
 2021: Atlantic Council Democracy & Tech Initiative, Senior Fellow
 2022: US State Department, member of the Foreign Affairs Policy Board

Works and publications

See also
 List of Wikipedia people

References

Further reading

External links 

 
 Katherine (WMF) on Meta
 
 

1983 births
American Wikimedians
American officials of the United Nations
American women chief executives
Articles containing video clips
Living people
New York University alumni
People from Wilton, Connecticut
Place of birth missing (living people)
UNICEF people
Wikimedia Foundation staff members
World Bank people
Wilton High School alumni
21st-century American women